Labeo kirkii is fish in genus Labeo from the Congo River in the Democratic Republic of the Congo and the Rovuma River on the border between Tanzania and Mozambique..

References 

Labeo
Fish described in 1903